The Winx Stakes, registered as the Warwick Stakes, is a Group 1 Australian Turf Club thoroughbred horse race at Weight for Age, for three-year-olds and older over a distance of 1400 metres at Randwick Racecourse, Sydney, Australia in August. Prize money is currently A$500,000.

History

In 2015 prizemoney was increased from $175,000 to $250,000 and in 2018 to $500,000.

1946 racebook

Name
In 2018 the race was renamed to the Winx Stakes, in honour of the champion Australian racehorse.

Records
 Record time for the 1300 metres was set by Al Mansour (2000) in 1:14.77.  
 Jockey Darby Munro won six Warwick Stakes with Rogilla (1935), Allunga (1937), Beaulivre (1940), Katanga (1943), Removal (1945) and Tarien (1954).

Distance
 1923–1929 - 7 furlongs
 1930–1937 - 1 mile
 1938–1971 - 7 furlongs
 1972–1999 – 1400 metres
 2000–2001 – 1300 metres
 2002 onwards - 1400 metres

Grade
 Prior to 1978 - Principal race
 1979–2017 - Group 2
 2018 onwards - Group 1

Venue

1923–1939 - Warwick Farm Racecourse 
1940–1950 - Randwick Racecourse 
1951–1992 - Warwick Farm Racecourse 
1993 - Randwick Racecourse
1994–1999 - Warwick Farm Racecourse 
2000 - Canterbury Park Racecourse
2001–2002 - Warwick Farm Racecourse 
2003 - Randwick Racecourse
2004 - Warwick Farm Racecourse 
2005–2006 - Randwick Racecourse
2008 - Warwick Farm Racecourse
2009 - Randwick Racecourse
2010–2013 - Warwick Farm Racecourse
2014 onwards - Randwick Racecourse

Gallery of noted winners

Winners

 2021 - Mo'unga
 2020 - Verry Elleegant
 2019 - Samadoubt
 2018 - Winx
 2017 - Winx
 2016 - Winx
 2015 - Royal Descent
 2014 - Tiger Tees
 2013 - Veyron
 2012 - Pinwheel
 2011 - Pinwheel
 2010 - Metal Bender
 2009 - Trusting
 2008 - Racing To Win
 2007 - †race not held
 2006 - Court's In Session
 2005 - Sir Dex
 2004 - Private Steer
 2003 - Lonhro
 2002 - Defier
 2001 - Lonhro
 2000 - Al Mansour
 1999 - Sunline
 1998 - What Can I Say
 1997 - Filante
 1996 - Filante
 1995 - Star Dancer
 1994 - March Hare
 1993 - Prince Of Praise
 1992 - Shaftesbury Avenue
 1991 - Super Impose
 1990 - Super Impose
 1989 - Groucho
 1988 - Flotilla
 1987 - Pablo's Pulse
 1986 - Riverdale
 1985 - Castanillia
 1984 - Phillip
 1983 - Yoyangamble
 1982 - Kingston Town
 1981 - Kingston Town
 1980 - Kingston Town 
 1979 - Gypsy Kingdom 
 1978 - Party's Pride
 1977 - Proficient
 1976 - Purple Patch
 1975 - Silver Shadow 
 1974 - Jenarkol
 1973 - Longfella
 1972 - Nippon
 1971 - Ricochet
 1970 - Royal Show
 1969 - Fair Law
 1968 - Swift Peter
 1967 - Gay Gauntlet
 1966 - Prince Max
 1965 - Gay Gauntlet
 1964 - Reveille
 1963 - Cele's Image
 1962 - Sky High
 1961 - Sky High
 1960 - Sparkler
 1959 - Up And Coming 
 1958 - Grey Ghost
 1957 - Tulloch
 1956 - El Khobar
 1955 - Prince Cortauld
 1954 - Tarien
 1953 - Tarien
 1952 - Foreign Exchange
 1951 - San Domenico
 1950 - San Domenico
 1949 - The Groom
 1948 - Septet
 1947 - Victory Lad
 1946 - Bernborough
 1945 - Removal
 1944 - Flight
 1943 - Katanga
 1942 - Yaralla
 1941 - High Caste
 1940 - Beaulivre
 1939 - Defaulter
 1938 - Stretto
 1937 - Allunga
 1936 - Talking
 1935 - ‡Rogilla/Silver King
 1934 - Chatham
 1933 - Chatham
 1932 - Johnnie Jason
 1931 - Johnnie Jason
 1930 - Amounis
 1929 - Limerick
 1928 - Limerick
 1927 - Limerick
 1926 - Windbag
 1925 - Whittier
 1924 - Glentruin
 1923 - Sunburst

† Not held because of outbreak of equine influenza 

‡ Dead heat

See also
 List of Australian Group races
 Group races

External links 
 Warwick Stakes (ATC)

References

Horse races in Australia